USS K-1 (SS-32) was the lead ship of her class of submarine of the United States Navy. Originally named  until renamed while under construction, she participated in World War I as a patrol sub off the coast of the Azores in southwest Europe.

Construction history

Her keel was laid down by the Fore River Shipbuilding Company in Quincy, Massachusetts, on 20 February 1912, as Haddock, making her the first ship of the United States Navy to be named for the haddock, a small edible Atlantic fish related to the cod, but on 17 November 1911, while under construction, she was renamed K-1. She was launched on 3 September 1913 sponsored by Mrs. Albert Ware Marshall and commissioned on 17 March 1914.

Ship history

Upon completion of six months training, K-1 joined the 4th Division, Atlantic Torpedo Flotilla, Newport, Rhode Island, on 9 October 1914. The submarine departed New York City on 19 January for underwater development training out of Key West, Florida. She continued operations along the East Coast for almost three years, aiding in the development of submarine-warfare tactics. The techniques learned from these experiments were soon put into practice when U-boats began attacking Allied shipping bound for Europe.

K-1 departed New London, Connecticut, on 12 October 1917, arriving Ponta Delgada 15 days later to conduct patrol cruises off the Azores. For the duration of the war, she conducted patrol cruises off the Azores and searched for the enemy U-boats, and protected shipping from surface attack. Upon cessation of hostilities 11 November 1918, the submarine arrived Philadelphia, Pennsylvania, on 13 December to resume coastal operations.

Test ship

From 1919 to 1923, K-1 cruised along the Atlantic coast from New England to Florida conducting experimental exercises. The development of submarines was greatly accelerated through the technology learned from these experiments. New listening devices, storage batteries, and torpedoes were tested.  K-1 arrived Hampton Roads on 1 November 1922 and remained until she decommissioned 7 March 1923. She was sold as scrap 25 June 1931.

Notes

References

External links
 

United States K-class submarines
World War I submarines of the United States
Ships built in Quincy, Massachusetts
1913 ships